Pedro Iturralde Ochoa (13 July 1929 – 1 November 2020) was a Spanish saxophonist, saxophone teacher and composer.

Biography
Iturralde was born in Falces on 3 July 1929. He began his musical studies with his father and performed in his first professional engagements on saxophone at age eleven. He graduated from the Royal Conservatory of Music in Madrid, where he studied clarinet, piano, and harmony.

He went on to lead his own jazz quartet at the W. Jazz Club in Madrid, experimenting with the combined use of flamenco and jazz, and making recordings for the Blue Note label. In 1972 he undertook further study in harmony and arranging at the Berklee College of Music in Boston. He taught saxophone at the Madrid Conservatory from 1978 until his retirement in 1994.

He appeared in Spain and abroad as a soloist with the Spanish National Orchestra under the baton of Frühbeck de Burgos, Celibidache, Markevitch, and others.

When he was 20 years old he composed Czárdás for saxophone. He dedicated the present version of the work, orchestrated by his brother Javier, to a friend, saxophonist Theodore Kerkezos.

He made recordings with the renowned flamenco guitarists Paco de Lucía (Columbia YS-2072-H, 1967 and Hiaspavox, 1968), Pepe de Antequerra (Columbia YS-2072-H, 1967) and Paco Cepero (CBS, 1975). He also recorded with jazz vocalist Donna Hightower on her I'm In Love with Love album (Columbia, 1974) and arranged/conducted on her El Jazz y Donna Hightower album (Columbia, 1975).

He died in Madrid on 1 November 2020.

References

External links
 Iturralde, Pedro Naxos profile
 Flamenco World (in Spanish)
 
 

1929 births
2020 deaths
Spanish classical musicians
Spanish jazz saxophonists
Madrid Royal Conservatory alumni
Academic staff of the Madrid Royal Conservatory
21st-century classical composers
20th-century classical composers
Jazz tenor saxophonists
Jazz soprano saxophonists
Male classical composers
20th-century Spanish musicians
20th-century saxophonists
21st-century saxophonists
20th-century Spanish male musicians
21st-century male musicians
Male jazz musicians
People from Ribera Arga-Aragón